The Tasmanian grassgrub or corbie (Oncopera intricata) is a moth of the family Hepialidae. It is found in Tasmania.

The larvae feed on Fragaria species as well as grasses.

References

Moths described in 1856
Hepialidae